The 1964–65 NCAA College Division men's ice hockey season began in November 1964 and concluded in March. This was the first formal season of College Division ice hockey and was caused by ECAC Hockey dividing its 29-team conference into an upper- and lower-tier. The lower tier, called ECAC 2, was the first official non-university conference. 

The entire College Division was a loose collection of schools with most leagues not even having a playoff tournament. The College Division never had a formal national tournament during its existence and it was only in 1977 that a second-tier National Championship was created, 4 years after the NCAA adopted the numerical classification system.

Regular season

Season tournaments

Standings

See also
 1964–65 NCAA University Division men's ice hockey season

References

External links

 
NCAA